Dilshod Turdiev (born 19 October 1991 in Fergana) is an Uzbekistani Greco-Roman wrestler. He competed in the men's Greco-Roman 75 kg event at the 2016 Summer Olympics, in which he was eliminated in the round of 16 by Viktor Nemeš.

References

External links
 

1991 births
Living people
Uzbekistani male sport wrestlers
Olympic wrestlers of Uzbekistan
Wrestlers at the 2016 Summer Olympics
Wrestlers at the 2014 Asian Games
Medalists at the 2014 Asian Games
Asian Games medalists in wrestling
Asian Games silver medalists for Uzbekistan
20th-century Uzbekistani people
21st-century Uzbekistani people